The 1922 Manitoba general election was held on July 18, 1922 to elect Members of the Legislative Assembly of the Province of Manitoba, Canada.  The United Farmers of Manitoba won a narrow majority in the legislature.

As in the previous election of 1920, the city of Winnipeg elected ten members by the single transferable ballot.  All other constituencies elected one member by first-past-the-post balloting. Before the next election, the 1927 Manitoba general election, the districts outside Winnipeg switched to Instant-runoff voting.

Summary
This election was a watershed moment in Manitoba's political history.  Since the formal introduction of partisan government in 1888, Manitoba had been governed alternately by the Liberal Party and the Conservative Party.  Although the previous election of 1920 sustained the Liberals in power, it also saw the two-party dichotomy weakened by the rise of farmer and labour parliamentary blocs.  

In 1922, the old parties were mostly swept away by the United Farmers of Manitoba (UFM). The UFM and Progressives candidates won 25 seats out of 52.  Elections in three northern seats were deferred until later dates for logistical reasons.

The UFM had existed for several years as a farmer's organization, but some of its members ran as "Independent-Farmers" in the 1920 election.  In 1921, however, the UFM announced it would field candidates during the 1922 campaign.  The UFM was opposed to partisanship, and its most prominent members insisted that it was not a "party" in the traditional sense.  UFM candidates often highlighted their lack of experience in partisan politics, and promised to govern the province in a restrained and responsible manner if elected to office.

The UFM membership was also heterogeneous.  Although many supporters were free-trade agrarian Liberals before 1920, a number were also Conservatives.  Some prominent UFM figures were also notable members of Manitoba's francophone community, which generally supported the Conservative Party before 1920.

The United Farmers fielded candidates in rural constituencies, and also endorsed candidates of the Progressive Association in Winnipeg.  Even with these endorsements, the UFM operated on a shoestring budget, and  fielded candidates in only two-thirds of the ridings.  However, in a major upset, the UFM and Progressives won 25 seats out of 52. 

Not even the UFM had expected to win government.  Indeed, its expectations were so low that it had not had a formal leader during the campaign.  Thus, when the UFM caucus met after the election, its first task was to choose a leader who would become premier.  Thomas Crerar and Robert Hoey declined invitations to govern, and the caucus turned to John Bracken, president of the Manitoba Agricultural College.  Although he had no political experience, Bracken accepted the appointment.  He ran in one of the deferred elections, in The Pas, and was elected.  

The UFM also won the deferred elections in Ethelbert and Rupertsland. This gave the government a bare majority of two seats. The UFM's political arm branded itself as the Progressive Party of Manitoba.

The other parties fared poorly in the 1922 campaign.  The Liberals, led by outgoing premier Tobias Norris, fell from twenty-one seats to eight.  The Conservatives, under their newly chosen leader Fawcett Taylor, fell from eight seats to seven.

The Independent Labour Party also experienced difficulties.  In the 1920 election, Manitoba's various left-wing and working-class groups submerged their differences to run a united campaign.  This cooperation was successful, and eleven labour candidates were elected to form the second-largest parliamentary bloc.  By the 1922 election, however, the Labour Party was beset by long-standing divisions among socialists, communists and conservative trade unionists.

A total of thirteen labour candidates ran for ten seats in Winnipeg.  Six were members of the ILP, and a seventh, former Social Democrat John Queen, ran as an "Independent Workers" candidate allied with the ILP.  The other candidates were divided among themselves.  The banned Communist Party ran three candidates under its legal front, the Workers Party.  These candidates disrupted meetings of Socialist incumbent George Armstrong, and accused him of selling out his principles to moderates and social gospellers.  Two conservative trade-unionists also ran as Union Labour candidates, opposing radicalism in the labour movement.

Five ILP candidates were elected, and John Queen was also elected in Winnipeg. Labour leader Fred Dixon topped the poll in Winnipeg for a second time, although by a reduced margin from 1920.  George Armstrong lost his Winnipeg seat, and no other labour candidates were elected. Six independent candidates were also elected.

The Progressives would go on to govern Manitoba alone until 1932, when they joined forces with the Liberals to form the "Liberal-Progressive Party." The Liberal-Progressives would go on to govern Manitoba, either alone or in coalition, until 1959.

Results

|- bgcolor=CCCCCC
!rowspan="2" colspan="2" align=left|Party
!rowspan="2" align=left|Party leader
!rowspan="2"|Candidates
!colspan="3" align=center|Seats
!colspan="5" align=center|Popular vote
|- bgcolor=CCCCCC
|align="center"|1920
|align="center"|1922
|align="center"|+/—
|align="center"|1920
|align="center"|1922
|align="center"|+/—
|align="center"|%
|align="center"|Change

|align=left|none
|align="right"|49
|align="right"|10
|align="right"|28
|align="right"| +18
|align="right"|20,299
|align="right"|49,767
|align="right"| +29,468
|align="right"|32.8%
|align="right"| +18.7%

|align=left|Tobias Norris
|align="right"|38
|align="right"|21
|align="right"|8
|align="right"| -13
|align="right"|50,422
|align="right"|35,225
|align="right"| -15,197
|align="right"|23.2%
|align="right"| -11.9%

|align=left|Fawcett Taylor
|align="right"|26
|align="right"|8
|align="right"|7
|align="right"| -1
|align="right"|25,083
|align="right"|23,539
|align="right"| -1,544
|align="right"|15.5%
|align="right"| -2.0%

|align=left|Dominion Labour Party
|align=left|Fred Dixon
|align="right"|12
|align="right"|8
|align="right"|5
|align="right"| -3
|align="right"|23,390
|align="right"|16,781
|align="right"| -6,609
|align="right"|11.1%
|align="right"| -5.2%

|
|align="right"|20
|align="right"|1
|align="right"|5
|align="right"| +4
|align="right"|14,145
|align="right"|15,434
|align="right"| +1,289
|align="right"|10.2%
|align="right"| +0.4%

|align=left|Moderation League
|align=left|J.K. Downes
|align="right"|1
|align="right"|–
|align="right"|1
|align="right"| +1
|align="right"|–
|align="right"|3,621
|align="right"| +3,621
|align="right"|2.8%
|align="right"|n/a

|align=left|Independent Workers
|align=left|John Queen
|align="right"|1
|align="right"|1
|align="right"|1
|align="right"|–
|align="right"|1,253
|align="right"|2,348
|align="right"| +1,095
|align="right"|2.7%
|align="right"| +1.8%

|align=left|Brandon Labour Party
|align=left|Albert Edward Smith
|align="right"|1
|align="right"|1
|align="right"|–
|align="right"| -1
|align="right"|2,007
|align="right"|2,060
|align="right"| +53
|align="right"|1.4%
|align="right"|–

|
|align="right"|5
|align="right"|–
|align="right"|–
|align="right"|–
|align="right"|–
|align="right"|1,728
|align="right"| +1,728
|align="right"|1.1%
|align="right"|n/a

|align=left|Socialist
|align=left|George Armstrong
|align="right"|1
|align="right"|1
|align="right"|–
|align="right"| -1
|align="right"|2,767
|align="right"|1,271
|align="right"| -1,496
|align="right"|0.8%
|align="right"| -1.1%

|align=left|Independent Farmer
|
|align="right"|–
|align="right"|3
|align="right"|–
|align="right"| -3
|align="right"|2,863
|align="right"|–
|align="right"| -2,863
|align="right"|–
|align="right"|n/a

|align=left|Independent-Conservative
|
|align="right"|–
|align="right"|1
|align="right"|–
|align="right"| -1
|align="right"|1,434
|align="right"|–
|align="right"| -1,434
|align="right"|–
|align="right"|n/a
|-
|align=left colspan="3"|Totals
|align="right"|154
|align="right"|55
|align="right"|55
|align="right"|–
|align="right"|143,663
|align="right"|151,774
|align="right"|+8,111
|align="right"|100.0%
|align="right"|–
|-
|align=left colspan="7"|Registered voters and turnout
|align="right"|209,760
|align="right"|222,499
|align="right"|+12,739
|align="right"|69.4%
|align="right"|-1.2%
|}

Rural Manitoba

|-
| style="background-color:whitesmoke" |Arthur
||
|Duncan Lloyd McLeod1130
|
|John Williams777
|
|
|
|
|
|
||
|John Williams
|-
| style="background-color:whitesmoke" |Beautiful Plains
||
|George Little1534
|
|James A. Dempsey429
|
|Richard E. Coad939
|
|
|
|
||
|George Little
|-
| style="background-color:whitesmoke" |Birtle
||
|William Short1307
|
|William Iverbach710
|
|
|
|
|
|
||
|George Malcolm
|-
| style="background-color:whitesmoke" |Brandon City
|
|
|
|
|
|
|
|Albert Edward Smith (Brandon Labour Party/CLP)2060
||
|John Edmison (Ind)3281
||
|Albert Edward Smith
|-
| style="background-color:whitesmoke" |Carillon
||
|Albert Prefontaine1010
|
|
|
|
|
|
|
|Maurice Duprey (Ind)694
||
|Maurice Duprey
|-
| style="background-color:whitesmoke" |Cypress
|
|John Alexander Young1205
|
|
||
|William Spinks1252
|
|
|
|
||
|William Spinks
|-
| style="background-color:whitesmoke" |Dauphin
|
|Henry Pears Nicholson658
||
|Archibald Esplen825
|
|
|
|George Palmer (ILP)742
|
|
||
|George Palmer
|-
| style="background-color:whitesmoke" |Deloraine
||
|Duncan Stuart McLeod1012
|
|Robert Thornton810
|
|William Chalmers829
|
|
|
|
||
|Robert Thornton
|-
| style="background-color:whitesmoke" |Dufferin
||
|William Brown1645
|
|
|
|
|
|
|
|Herbert Robinson (Ind)1504
||
|Edward August
|-
| style="background-color:whitesmoke" |Emerson
|
|Robert Curran566
|
|H. Stewart435
|
|D.H. McFadden567
|
|
||
|Dmytro Yakimischak (Ind. Farmer)998
||
|Dmytro Yakimischak
|-
| style="background-color:whitesmoke" |Fairford
|
|G.L. Marron398
||
|Albert Kirvan810
|
|
|
|
|
|
||
|Albert Kirvan
|-
| style="background-color:whitesmoke" |Fisher
||
|Nicholas Bachynsky581
|
|John Garfield Hamilton262
|
|
|
|
|
|Henry L. Mabb (Ind)354
||
|Henry L. Mabb
|-
| style="background-color:whitesmoke" |Gilbert Plains
||
|Arthur Berry1034
|
|George Darling Shortreed317
|
|
|
|
|
|Horace Priestly Barrett (Ind)499
||
|William Findlater
|-
| style="background-color:whitesmoke" |Gimli
|
|Ingimar Ingaldson1310
||
|Michael Rojeski1570
|
|Elias Grabosky103
|
|
|
|
||
|Gudmundur Fjelsted
|-
| style="background-color:whitesmoke" |Gladstone
||
|Albert McGregor1527
|
|David Smith649
|
|F.J. Erick Rhind387
|
|
|
|
||
|James Armstrong
|-
| style="background-color:whitesmoke" |Glenwood
|
|Wellington Geddas Rathwell950

||
|James Breakey1468
|
|
|
|
|
|
||
|William RobsonInd. Farmer
|-
| style="background-color:whitesmoke" |Hamiota
||
|Thomas Wolstenholme1338
|
|John Henry McConnell935
|
|
|
|
|
|
||
|John Henry McConnell
|-
| style="background-color:whitesmoke" |Iberville
||
|Arthur Boivin902
|
|H.A. Mullins290

|
|
|
|
|
|
||
|Arthur Boivin
|-
| style="background-color:whitesmoke" |Killarney
||
|Andrew Foster949
|
|Thomas H. Buck394

|
|G.W. Waldon747
|
|
|
|
||
|Samuel Fletcher
|-
| style="background-color:whitesmoke" |Lakeside
||
|Douglas Campbell1591
|
|
|
|Herbert Muir1101
|
|
|
|
||
|Charles Duncan McPherson
|-
| style="background-color:whitesmoke" |Lansdowne
|
|John Morrison Allen1219
||
|Tobias Norris1680
|
|
|
|
|
|
||
|Tobias Norris
|-
| style="background-color:whitesmoke" |La Verendrye
||
|Philippe Adjutor Talbot1134
|
|L.P. Roy694
|
|
|
|
|
|
||
|Philippe Adjutor Talbot
|-
| style="background-color:whitesmoke" |Manitou
||
|George Compton1049
|
|G.E. Davidson531
|
|John Ridley1018
|
|
|
|Joseph B. Lane (Ind)548
||
|John Ridley
|-
| style="background-color:whitesmoke" |Minnedosa
||
|Neil Cameron1966
|
|A.W. Shaw1160
|
|
|
|
|
|
||
|George Grierson
|-
| style="background-color:whitesmoke" |Morden and Rhineland
|
|John Sweet960
|
|
||
|John Kennedy1297
|
|
|
|
||
|John Kennedy
|-
| style="background-color:whitesmoke" |Morris
||
|William Clubb1222
|
|Alex Ayotte751
|
|
|
|
|
|
||
|William Clubb
|-
| style="background-color:whitesmoke" |Mountain
||
|Charles Cannon1580
|
|James Baird968
|
|George M. Fraser578
|
|
|
|
||
|James Baird
|-
| style="background-color:whitesmoke" |Norfolk
||
|John Muirhead1279
|
|
|
|Reuben J. Waugh1142
|
|
|
|
||
|Reuben J. Waugh
|-
| style="background-color:whitesmoke" |Portage la Prairie
|
|
|
|Charles D. McPherson1307
||
|Fawcett Taylor1436
|
|
|
|
||
|Fawcett Taylor
|-
| style="background-color:whitesmoke" |Roblin
|
|Henry Richardson1176
|
|
||
|Fred Newton1185
|
|
|
|
||
|Henry Richardson
|-
| style="background-color:whitesmoke" |Rockwood
||
|William McKinnell1374
|
|
|
|Harvey Hicks706
|
|
|
|Robert William Rutherford (Ind)703
||
|William McKinnell
|-
| style="background-color:whitesmoke" |Russell
||
|Isaac Griffiths1177
|
|William W.W. Wilson783
|
|Edgar Carnegy De Balinhard741
|
|
|
|
||
|William W.W. Wilson
|-
| style="background-color:whitesmoke" |St. George
|
|Albert E. Kristjansson860
||
|Skuli Sigfusson1512
|
|
|
|
|
|
||
|Albert E. Kristjansson
|-
| style="background-color:whitesmoke" |Ste. Rose
|
|Thomas McDonald1272
|
|
|
|
|
|
||
|Joseph Hamelin (Ind)1362
||
|Joseph Hamelin
|-
| style="background-color:whitesmoke" |Swan River
||
|Robert Emmond1320
|
|
|
|Daniel Hawe Sr.548
|
|
|
|
||
|Robert Emmond
|-
| style="background-color:whitesmoke" |Turtle Mountain
|
|R.W. Ramson955
|
|
||
|Richard G. Willis1059
|
|
|
|
||
|George William McDonald
|-
| style="background-color:whitesmoke" |Virden
||
|Robert Mooney1638
|
|George Clingan961
|
|
|
|
|
|
||
|George Clingan
|}

Winnipeg suburbs

|-
| style="background-color:whitesmoke" |Assiniboia
|
|Charles L. Richardson999
|
|
|
|
||
|William Bayley (ILP)1844
|
|William Bourke (Ind)843John Haddon (Ind)494
||
|William Bayley
|-
| style="background-color:whitesmoke" |Kildonan & St. Andrews
|
|Samuel Henry Summerscales828
|
|Free Larter977
|
|
||
|Charles Albert Tanner (ILP)1453
|
|
||
|Charles Albert Tanner
|-
| style="background-color:whitesmoke" |St. Boniface
|
|
|
|H.M. Sutherland1176
|
|
|
|Charles W. Foster (ILP)1124
||
|Joseph Bernier (Ind)2024
||
|Joseph Bernier
|-
| style="background-color:whitesmoke" |St. Clements
|
|Hugh Connolly532
|
|
|
|
|
|Nicolas Kolisynk (Workers)387Matthew Stanbridge (ILP)352
||
|Donald Ross (Ind)1245
||
|Matthew Stanbridge
|-
| style="background-color:whitesmoke" |Springfield
||
|Clifford Barclay1014
|
|William James Black854
|
|Samuel Leonard Henry365
|
|
|
|
||
|Arthur Moore
|}

Winnipeg

Final results for Winnipeg:  Liberal 2, Conservative 2, ILP 3, Moderation League 1, Independent Worker 1, Progressive 1

Valid votes: 44,328
Quota: 4030

Note: Reports of vote tallies were incomplete for counts 32–36. Count 31 was used as the base for calculating applicable percentages above.

Deferred elections
Elections for several northern ridings were deferred to later dates:

|-
| style="background-color:whitesmoke" |Ethelbert(August 26, 1922)
||
|Nicholas A. Hryhorczukacclaimed
|
|
|
|
|
|
|
|
||
|Nicholas A. HryhorczukInd. Farmer
|-
| style="background-color:whitesmoke" |Rupertsland(September 13, 1922)
||
|Francis Blackacclaimed
|
|
|
|
|
|
|
|
||
|John Morrison
|-
| style="background-color:whitesmoke" |The Pas(October 5, 1922)
||
|John Bracken472
|
|
|
|
|
|
|
|Herman Finger (Ind) 118P.C. Robertson (Ind) 71R.H. MacNeill (Ind) 38
||
|Edward Brown
|}

Early by-elections
When Duncan Lloyd McLeod (Arthur), Neil Cameron (Minnedosa) and William Clubb (Morris) were appointed to cabinet on August 8, 1922, they were obliged to resign their seats and seek re-election. All were returned by acclamation on August 26, 1922.

Post-election changes

Winnipeg (res. Fred Dixon, July 27, 1923)

Mountain (Charles Cannon appointed to cabinet, December 3, 1923), December 24, 1923:
Charles Cannon (P) 1630
George Fraser (C) 857

Carillon (Albert Prefontaine appointed to cabinet, December 3, 1923), December 24, 1923:
Albert Prefontaine (P) 1177
Maurice Dupez (Ind) 494

Assiniboia (William Bayley leaves the Labour Party on January 8, 1924)

Lansdowne (res. Tobias Norris, 1925), December 9, 1925:
Tobias Norris (L) accl.

St. Boniface (res. Joseph Bernier, September 1, 1926)

Further reading
 
 

1922 elections in Canada
1922
1922 in Manitoba
July 1922 events